Maurice Ruah (born 19 February 1971) is a former professional tennis player from Venezuela. He achieved a career-high doubles ranking of world No. 82 in 1994.

His father Luis works in medical supplies and in the shoe industry, and his mother Claire assists her husband in medical supplies.

He and his doubles partner Yohny Romero won a bronze medal at the 1999 Pan American Games.

Ruah participated in 19 Davis Cup ties for Venezuela from 1989 to 2000, posting a 17–17 record in singles and an 8–5 record in doubles.

In July 2019, he becomes captain of the Davis Cup.

Doubles titles

References

External links
 
 
 

Tennis players from Caracas
Venezuelan male tennis players
Living people
1971 births
Venezuelan Jews
Jewish tennis players
Tennis players at the 1999 Pan American Games
Pan American Games medalists in tennis
Pan American Games bronze medalists for Venezuela
Medalists at the 1999 Pan American Games
20th-century Venezuelan people
21st-century Venezuelan people